Xenomigia is a genus of moths of the family Notodontidae.

Species
The genus consists of the following species:
Xenomigia brachyptera  Sattler and Wojtusiak, 2000
Xenomigia caesura Miller, 2011
Xenomigia concinna  Dognin, 1911
Xenomigia consanguinea  (Dognin, 1911) 
Xenomigia cosanga Miller, 2011
Xenomigia crenula Miller, 2011
Xenomigia cuneifera  Dognin, 1913
Xenomigia dactyloides Miller, 2011
Xenomigia disciplaga  Hering, 1926
Xenomigia fassli  Prout, 1918
Xenomigia flavivulta Miller, 2011
Xenomigia involuta  Miller, 2008
Xenomigia monticolata  (Maassen, 1890) 
Xenomigia noctipenna Miller, 2011
Xenomigia nubilata  (Dognin, 1912) 
Xenomigia phaeoloma Miller, 2011
Xenomigia pinasi  Miller, 2008
Xenomigia premiosa Miller, 2011
Xenomigia sordida  Dognin, 1913
Xenomigia veninotata  Warren, 1906
Xenomigia wilmeri Miller, 2011

References

Notodontidae of South America